Frogden Quarry is a 0.2 hectare geological Site of Special Scientific Interest in Dorset, England, notified in 1954, by geologist Benjamin Starr. It exposes rocks of the Inferior Oolite, of Aalenian and Bajocian age. The sequence largely consists of limestone, with some marl and siltstone.

Sources
 English Nature citation sheet for the site (accessed 31 August 2006)

External links
 English Nature website (SSSI information)

References

Sites of Special Scientific Interest in Dorset
Sites of Special Scientific Interest notified in 1954
Geology of Dorset
Quarries in Dorset